Shut Out is the debut album by American actor, singer and songwriter Paul Jabara.

The album which was released on the Casablanca Records label in 1977 includes the singles "Shut Out" (a duet with Donna Summer), "Dance"  and "Slow Dancing". The original LP was pressed on red vinyl.

Shut Out has yet to be re-released on CD.

Track listing
Side one
 "Shut Out" (featuring Donna Summer)/ "Heaven Is a Disco" - 9:30
 "Dance" - 3:50
 "Slow Dancing" - 5:00

Side two
 "Yankee Doodle Dandy" - 3:10
 "Hungry for Love" - 4:35
 "Sun in Your Smile" - 3:02
 "Smile" - 3:36
 "It All Comes Back to You" - 4:49

Charts

References

Paul Jabara albums
1977 debut albums
Albums produced by Ron Dante
Casablanca Records albums